Fr. Liam Carey, was an Irish Roman Catholic priest and educator.
Fr. Carey was appointed to the Dublin Institute of Catholic Sociology (DICS) as director in 1963, he went for further study to Columbia University, and returned to Ireland in 1966  renamed it the Dublin Institute of Adult Education.
In 1969 he founded AONTAS, the National Association for the promotion of Adult Education.
In 1975 Fr Carey became the first staff member of the new Centre for Adult and Community Education at St. Patrick's College, Maynooth, which he served until 1993 when he retired.

Fr. Carey bequeathed over 2000 books to Maynooth University Library. 
He died in 2005.

References

Date of birth missing
2005 deaths
20th-century Irish Roman Catholic priests
Irish sociologists